Studio Gang is an American architecture and urban design practice with offices in Chicago, New York, San Francisco, and Paris. Founded and led by architect Jeanne Gang, the Studio is known for its material research and experimentation, collaboration across a wide range of disciplines, and focus on sustainability. The firm's works range in scale and typology from the 82-story mixed-use Aqua Tower to the 10,000-square-foot Arcus Center for Social Justice Leadership at Kalamazoo College to the 14-acre Nature Boardwalk at Lincoln Park Zoo. Studio Gang has won numerous awards for design excellence, including the 2016 Architizer A+ Firm of the Year Award and the 2013 National Design Award for Architecture from the Cooper Hewitt, Smithsonian Design Museum, as well as various awards from the American Institute of Architects (AIA) and AIA Chicago.

Background 

The firm was founded by Jeanne Gang in 1997.

One of the Studio's first built works, the Bengt Sjostrom Starlight Theatre, was completed in 2003, and won praise from critics; the Chinese American Service League Kam Liu Center, finished the following year, garnered the firm additional accolades. Aqua Tower and the Nature Boardwalk at Lincoln Park Zoo, both completed in 2010, significantly increased the Studio global profile, winning acclaim from architecture critics.

The WMS Boathouse at Clark Park, and Eleanor Boathouse at Park 571, feature a sculptural roof that translates the motion of rowing and are two of four boathouses intended to revitalize the Chicago River.

The Studio's Northerly Island project, which transforms a former airfield into a public lakefront park and habitat, opened to the public in 2015.

The Studio employs more than 90 people as of May 2017.

Selected projects

Towers

Education

Nature, Culture, and Community

Exhibitions

Selected awards 
Institute Honor Award, Interior Architecture, AIA Awards, 2017 / Writers Theatre
 Daniel Burnham Award for Master Planning, AIA Illinois, 2016 / Technical team for Positioning Pullman 
 Divine Detail Award, Design Excellence Awards, AIA Chicago, 2016 / Writers Theatre 
 Interior Architecture Award, Design Excellence Awards, AIA Chicago, 2016 / Writers Theatre 
 Distinguished Building Citation of Merit, Design Excellence Awards, AIA Chicago, 2016 / Writers Theatre 
 Divine Detail Award, Design Excellence Awards, AIA Chicago, 2016 / City Hyde Park 
 Distinguished Building Citation of Merit, Design Excellence Awards, AIA Chicago, 2016 / City Hyde Park 
 Institute Honor Award, Architecture, AIA Awards, 2016 / WMS Boathouse at Clark Park 
 Architizer A+ Firm of the Year, 2016 
 Award for Excellence in Design, Thirty-third Annual Design Awards, Public Design Commission, New York, 2015 / Rescue Company 2 
 Distinguished Building Award, Design Excellence Awards, AIA Chicago, 2015 / Arcus Center for Social Justice Leadership 
 Divine Detail Award, Design Excellence Awards, AIA Chicago, 2015 / Arcus Center for Social Justice Leadership 
 Honor Award, AIA Illinois, 2015 / Northerly Island 
 Distinguished Building Citation of Merit, Design Excellence Awards, AIA Chicago, 2014 / WMS Boathouse at Clark Park 
 National Design Award, Cooper Hewitt, Smithsonian Design Museum 
 Holcim Awards for Sustainable Construction Acknowledgement Prize North America, 2011, for the Ford Calumet Environmental Center 
 Distinguished Building Honor Award, AIA Chicago, 2011, for the Nature Boardwalk, Education Pavilion and South Pond Transformation at Lincoln Park Zoo
 Most Compassionate Architectural Firm, People for the Ethical Treatment of Animals (PETA), 2009
 Skyscraper of the Year Award, Emporis, 2009, for the Aqua Tower
 Emerging Visions Award, AIA Chicago, 2000 & 2006
 Neighborhood Development Award, 3rd place, Richard H. Driehaus Foundation, 2005, for the Chinese American Service League

References

External links
 
 
 "Jeanne Gang: The Art of Nesting," Metropolis Magazine
 Architecture-Page Profile
 Lincoln Park Zoo South Pond Restoration and Pavilion, Architectural Record, May 2011.
Finding aid for the Studio Gang Ford Calumet Environmental Center project records, Canadian Centre for Architecture

Architecture firms based in Chicago
1997 establishments in Illinois